Disha Oberoi, popularly known as RJ Disha , is a Radio Jockey from Bangalore, India. She works as RJ in Red FM 93.5

Early life and education
Disha was born in Delhi, brought up in Chennai. She went to college in Manipal.

Career
Disha started her career as a flight attendant with Jetairways an international airline. During her stint as a flight attendant, people used to compliment her on a unique voice and announcement skills and also advised her to experiment by putting it to good use.  She attended a workshop on RJ'ing and ended up being an RJ in Chennai. She moved to Bangalore later and became one among the best RJ's the city has ever seen.

Awards
Disha's show "Morning No 1 with Disha" has won the "New York Film Festival’s World’s Best Radio Programs Awards" in different categories consecutively for 4 years now.

 Best Information/News Talk Show in 2015  
 Best Human Interest Story in 2016.

References

External links

Indian women radio presenters
Indian radio presenters
People from Delhi
Writers from Bangalore
Living people
Journalists from Karnataka
Women writers from Karnataka
Year of birth missing (living people)